The Windows 9x series of operating systems refers to the kernel which lies at the heart of Windows 9x. Its architecture is monolithic.

The basic code is similar in function to MS-DOS. As a 16-/32-bit hybrid, it requires support from MS-DOS to operate.

Critical files
Windows 95 boots using the following set of files:

32-bit shell and command line interpreter:

 SHELL.DLL  and SHELL32.DLL – Shell API
 EXPLORER.EXE – Windows shell and file manager
 COMMAND.COM – command line shell executable

Windows 95 Core:

 KERNEL32.DLL and KRNL386.EXE – Windows API for Windows resources
 ADVAPI32.DLL  Functionality additional to the kernel. Includes functions for the Windows registry and shutdown and restart functions
 GDI32.DLL and GDI.EXE - Graphic device interface
 USER32.DLL and USER.EXE - GUI implementation
 COMMCTRL.DLL and COMCTL32.DLL - Common controls (user interface)
 DDEML.DLL Dynamic Data Exchange Management Library (DDEML) provides an interface that simplifies the task of adding DDE capability to an application
 MSGSRV32.EXE  Acts as a 32-bit message server and will never appear in the Windows task list
 WIN.COM - responsible for loading the GUI and the Windows portion of the system

Registry and other configuration files:

 SYSTEM.DAT, USER.DAT - contains the Windows Registry
 MSDOS.SYS - contains some low-level boot settings and resources such as disabling double-buffering and the GUI logo
 WIN.INI and SYSTEM.INI - configuration files from Windows 3.1, processed in Windows 9x also

Virtual Machine Manager and configuration manager:

 VMM32.VXD - Virtual machine manager and default drivers. It takes over from io.sys as kernel
Installable file System Manager:

 IFSHLP.SYS - enables Windows to make direct file system calls bypassing MS-DOS methods
 IFSMGR.VXD - 32-bit driver for the installable file system
 IOS.VXD  I/O Supervisor that controls and manages all protected-mode file system and block device drivers
 MPREXE.EXE MPRSERV.DLL and MPR.DLL - Multiple Provider Router, required for network authentication and user profiles
 MSPWL32.DLL Password list management library

Device drivers:

 IO.SYS - executable handling all of the basic functions, such as I/O routines and also serves as kernel until vmm32.vxd takes over
 HIMEM.SYS -  DOS device driver which allows DOS programs to store data in extended memory via the Extended Memory Specification
 SYSTEM.DRV, MMSOUND.DRV, COMM.DRV , VGA.DRV, MOUSE.DRV, BIGMEM.DRV, KEYBOARD.DRV - 16-bit drivers
 CP 1252.NLS, CP 437.NLS, UNICODE.NLS, LOCALE.NLS - keyboard layouts
 RMM.PDR Real Mode Mapper Virtual Device

The system may also use CONFIG.SYS, which contains settings and commands executed before loading the command interpreter) and AUTOEXEC.BAT, which is a batch file automatically executed after loading COMMAND.COM. However, these two files are not critical to the boot process, as IO.SYS contains a default setting for both, in case of absence from the system. In Windows ME, CONFIG.SYS and AUTOEXEC.BAT are not processed and LOGO.SYS may be used as a splash screen.

Boot sequence
The Windows 9x startup process consists of 6 phases. The first two of these steps are common to any operating system booting using the traditional combination of BIOS and Master Boot Record.

Phase 1 - The ROM BIOS bootstrap process

The ROM BIOS starts the execution at the physical memory address FFFF0h. During this phase, BIOS first executes the Power-on self-test, then checks for the existence of a boot disk on drive A. If it is not found in drive A, the ROM BIOS checks for a hard disk. If the computer has a Plug and Play BIOS, in addition, BIOS checks the RAM for I/O port addresses, interrupt lines and DMA channels for Plug and Play devices, disables found devices, creates maps of used and unused resources and re-enables devices.

Phase 2 - The master boot record and boot sector

The Master boot record is loaded at address 7C00h and loads the boot sector of the Windows Disk partition. The boot sector contains the disk boot program and BIOS Parameter Block table which searches for the location of the root directory and IO.SYS file, which then loads the IO.SYS file into memory.

Phase 3 - IO.SYS file initialization

IO.SYS initializes the minimal File Allocation Table driver and loads MSDOS.SYS into memory.  It then displays "Starting Windows" depending on the Boot-Delay line in the MSDOS.SYS file. It then loads the LOGO.SYS file and displays a startup image on the screen. If the DRVSPACE.INI or DBLSPACE.INI file exists, it also loads drivers for compressed disks. Windows then attempts to open the registry file SYSTEM.DAT. If that fails, it attempts to open SYSTEM.DA0. If configured in MSDOS.SYS or in the registry, double buffering is also enabled.

Phase 4 - CONFIG.SYS and real mode configuration

Windows 95 to Windows 98 now analyze CONFIG.SYS and load MS-DOS real mode drivers. Windows ME ignores this.
If the CONFIG.SYS file does not exist, the IO.SYS file loads the drivers IFSHLP.SYS, HIMEM.SYS and  SETVER.EXE. Windows reserves all upper memory blocks for Windows 95 operating system use or for expanded memory.
Windows 95 to Windows 98 execute COMMAND.COM to process AUTOEXEC.BAT. It loads terminate and stay resident programs into memory. Windows ME ignores this step, as Real Mode DOS support is disabled and TSRs being loaded can compromise system stability.

Phase 5 - initialize drivers

IO.SYS now runs WIN.COM. WIN.COM loads the VMM32.VXD file into memory or accesses it from the hard disk. This file contains the most important drivers and the 9x kernel.
The real-mode virtual device driver loader checks for duplicate virtual device drivers that exist both in the Windows\System\Vmm32 folder and the VMM32.VXD file. In a case of duplicates, the driver in the Windows\System\Vmm32 directory will be loaded.
Windows 95 to 98 now query real mode drivers calling INT 2Fh and search for drivers in registry entry HKEY_LOCAL_MACHINE\System\CurrentControlSet\Services\VxD marked to be loaded as an external file. Vmm32 then analyzes the [386 Enh] section of the Windows\System.ini file and loads drivers listed there. Some important drivers are loaded even if they are not listed in the Windows Registry, SYSTEM.INI or in the Windows\System\Vmm32 directory.

Once the real-mode virtual device drivers are loaded, driver initialization on Windows 95 to Windows 98 occurs. Vmm32 then switches the CPU from real mode to protected mode.
The next step is the initialization of protected mode drivers, executed in three phases for each device: a critical part of initialization (while interrupts are disabled), device initialization (when file I/O is allowed) and InitComplete phase. After initialization of the display driver, Windows switches to graphical mode.

Phase 6 - Win32 initialization

Once all of the drivers are loaded, the Kernel32.dll, gdi32.dll, Gdi.exe, user32.dll, User.exe, shell32.dll and Explorer.exe files are loaded. The next step in the startup process is to load the network environment. The user is prompted to log on to the network that is configured. When a user logs on, their desktop settings are loaded from the registry, or the desktop configuration uses a default desktop. Windows then starts programs defined in the StartUp folder, WIN.INI and programs defined in registry keys Run, RunOnce, RunServices and RunServicesOnce inside the branches HKEY_LOCAL_MACHINE\Software\Microsoft\Windows\CurrentVersion and HKEY_CURRENT_USER\Software\Microsoft\Windows\CurrentVersion\. After each program in the RunOnce registry key is started, the program is removed from the key.

Kernel
The Windows 9x kernel is a 32-bit kernel with virtual memory. Drivers are provided by .VXD files or, since Windows 98, the newer WDM drivers can be used. However, the MS-DOS kernel stays resident in memory. Windows will use the old MS-DOS 16-bit drivers if they are installed, except on Windows Me. In Windows Me, DOS is still running, but Windows will ignore any attempt to load its device drivers when parsing the AUTOEXEC.BAT, and will move the environment variables that it still recognizes from the CONFIG.SYS into the Windows Registry.

See also
 Architecture of Windows NT
 Microsoft Windows
 Caldera v. Microsoft
 WinGlue
 FreeWin95

References

Further reading
 
  (xviii+856+vi pages, 3.5"-floppy) Errata: 
 
  (NB. Also on MS-DOS 7+ HMA usage and \WINDOWS\IOS.LOG.)

External links
 
 
 

Monolithic kernels
Windows 9x
Windows 95
Windows 98
Windows ME